Duncan Dundas of Newliston was Lord Lyon King of Arms of Scotland from 1450 until 1490. The second son of James Dundas of that Ilk, Duncan was much noted in his time and was frequently employed in embassies to England. He is said to have discharged his duty in those negotiations "with integrity and honour". He acquired the feudal barony of Newliston, and founded a branch of the Dundas family there, the Dundases of Newliston.

Duncan's arms were the arms of his father (Argent, a Lion rampant Gules armed and langued Azure), with the addition of a crescent in the dexter-chief corner, as the mark of a second son.

Arms

References
 Burke, John, History of the Commoners of Great Britain and Ireland, vol.1, London, 1833, p. 643.

15th-century births
Scottish diplomats
Lord Lyon Kings of Arms
Year of death unknown